The Brasserie de Saint Sylvestre is a brewery in the Nord-Pas de Calais region of northeast France. Brewing in the town of Saint-Sylvestre-Cappel dates back to at least 1600, although the troubled history of Flanders has interrupted business several times.

3 Monts
While several beers are brewed here probably the best known is 3 Monts which is an 8.5% abv  Bière de Garde, brewed in the Flanders region of France where such beers are traditionally termed Bière de Garde, a form of keeping ale. The name of the beer refers to three hills in Flanders, Mont Noir in Belgium and  Mont Cassel & Mont des Cats both on the French side of the border.

References

External links
Brewery's Official site

Breweries of France
French brands
Buildings and structures in Nord (French department)